N3XT is the third album by the Romanian group Morandi, released in 2007. The album had a big success in Russia, Poland, Bulgaria, Ukraine and in other European countries. In Russia, N3XT was a three times multi-platinum CD. A song from this album, "Angels (Love Is The Answer)" occupied the first places in the European hit charts.

Track listing 
 "Into The Blue" 1:18
 "Angels (Love Is The Answer)" 3:45
 "Save Me" 4:32
 "Afrika" 4:15
 "Hiding From The Sun" 3:39
 "Musica Mi Libertad" 4:34
 "Get High" 3:46
 "Don't Look Back" 4:45
 "Sun Goes Down" 4:30
 "Oh My God (Superfly)" 4:11
 "N3xt" 3:46
 "The Last Tribe"	4:35
 "Love Is Tickling" 3:49
 "Reality And Dreams"	4:36

Singles
 "Afrika" (August 2007)
 "Angels (Love Is The Answer)" (December 2007)
 "Save Me" (feat. Helene) (May 2008)

References

External links
 Morandi - N3xt at Discogs

2007 albums
Morandi (band) albums